Joshua Shidambasi Odanga (July 5, 1924 – August 21, 2016) was a  Kenyan diplomat.

Career 
From 1942 to 1947 he was employed at the Kenya Post Office of the East African Posts and Telecommunications in the Kenya Colony.
From 1947 to 1949 he was instructor at the Post Office training School, Dar-es-Salaam and Nairobi. 
From 1949 to 1960 he was employed at the Kenya Post Office, East African Posts and Telecommunications.
In 1957 he was member of the  International Confederation of Free Trade Unions (ICFTU).
From 1961 to 1962 he was assistant post controller, Regional Headquarters, East African Posts and Telecommunications.
From 1963 to 1964 he was senior assistant postal controller, East African Headquarters and deputy regional director for Kenya, East African Posts and Telecommunications.
In 1965 he was member of the Kenya Industrial Court and member of the National Wages Advisory Committee.
From 1965 to 1969 he was chairman, Agricultural Wages Council.
From 1966 to 1974 he was regional director for Kenya of the East African Posts and Telecommunications.
From 1974 to 1976 he was ambassador in Mogadishu (Somalia)).
From 1977 to 1978 he was High commissioner (Commonwealth) in New Delhi (India)). 
From  to  he was ambassador in Beijing (China).

References

1924 births
2016 deaths
Ambassadors of Kenya to Somalia
High Commissioners of Kenya to India
Ambassadors of Kenya to China